Holaniku at Keahole Point is a 2MW micro-scaled concentrated solar power plant in the Kona District (west coast) of the island of Hawaii.  It is located in the Natural Energy Laboratory of Hawaii at Keahole Point.

Holaniku at Keahole Point is the first commercial solar thermal power plant to be built using solar collectors manufactured by Sopogy.  The project was developed by Keahole Solar Power, LLC. an Engineering, Procurement, and Contracting (EPC) company.  The plant contains over 1,000 Sopogy MicroCSP SopoNova parabolic trough solar collectors.  The power plant uses the sun's heat to create steam. Most of the steam created is used onsite for other experimental uses, equating to only 0.5MW maximum that can be utilized to generate electricity. Little, if any, electrical power leaves the site and enters the state electrical grid.

See also

 List of concentrating solar thermal power companies
 List of photovoltaic power stations
 List of solar thermal power stations
 Renewable energy in the United States
 Renewable portfolio standard
 Solar power in the United States
 Solar power in Hawaii

References

External links
 Keahole Solar Power

Solar power stations in Hawaii
Buildings and structures in Hawaii County, Hawaii
Solar thermal energy
Energy infrastructure completed in 2009